The European Investment Fund (EIF), established in 1994, is a financial institution for the provision of finance to SMEs (small and medium-sized enterprises), headquartered in Luxembourg. It is part of the European Investment Bank Group.

It does not lend money to SMEs directly; rather it provides finance through private banks and funds. Its main operations are in the areas of venture capital and guaranteeing loans. Its shareholders are: the European Investment Bank (62%); the European Union, represented by the European Commission (29%); and 30 privately owned EU financial institutions (9%).

The European Investment Bank Group is able to assist the development of a broader creative, green ecosystem through the European Investment Fund: venture capital funds, technical transfer, business perspectives, and private-sector equity (infrastructure funds) in general.

Since 2015, the EaSI Guarantee Instrument (EU Programme for Employment and Social Innovation), managed by the European Investment Fund, has provided over €280 million in guarantees across Europe and is expected to provide over €3 billion in financing to micro-enterprises and social enterprises. In the coming years, the EIF intends to continue providing assistance to these types of final beneficiaries in areas heavily impacted by the transition to a low-carbon economy.

See also
 Institutions of the European Union

Sources

European Investment Fund